Meleh Kabud (also Romanized as Meleh Kabūd; also known as Mollā Kabū and Mollā Kabūd) is a village in Howmeh-ye Sarpol Rural District, in the Central District of Sarpol-e Zahab County, Kermanshah Province, Iran. At the 2006 census, its population was 81, in 14 families.

References 

Populated places in Sarpol-e Zahab County